Ethmia ehakernae is a moth in the family Depressariidae. The habitat consists of rain forests.

The ground color of the forewings is whitish, covered by irregular, dark brownish longitudinal streaks and spots. The posterior half before the middle and the terminal area is paler. There are two spots near the base of the posterior half, the inner one very small and the outer one distinct. The hindwing ground colour are whitish basally, becoming brownish at the apical area.

Etymology
The species is named in honor of Eha Kern, for being one of the prime movers behind Children's Rainforest Sweden.

References

Moths described in 2014
ehakernae